is a Japanese actress and voice actress from Saitama Prefecture.

Filmography

Television animation
2004
Kyo Kara Maoh!, Shori Shibuya (childhood)
Windy Tales, Boy (ep 11), Announcer (ep 7)
2005
Onegai My Melody, Yamato
Ginga Legend Weed, Weed
Sugar Sugar Rune, Taiji Sugiyama
2006
Minami no Shima no Chiisana Hikouki Birdy, Dorū
2007
Kishin Taisen Gigantic Formula, Sergei Kulakovskii
D.Gray-man, Eric (ep 32)
2008
Kyo Kara Maoh! Season 3, Shori Shibuya (childhood)
2009
Katekyō Hitman Reborn!, Fran
Yu-Gi-Oh! 5D's, Sly
2010
Tayo the Little Bus, Alice 
Nura: Rise of the Yokai Clan, Umewakamaru (12 years old)
Mainichi Kaasan, Ōkawa-kun
2011
B-Daman Crossfire, Subaru Shirogane
Battle Girls: Time Paradox, Shingen Takeda
Yu-Gi-Oh! Zexal, Tron
2012
B-Daman Crossfire eS, Subaru Shirogane
Monsuno, Noah, Medea 
2013
Gundam Build Fighters, Aria von Reiji Asuna
Monsuno, Ash (childhood)
Baku Tech! Bakugan, Nibiru
Hajime no Ippo: Rising, Ippo Makunouchi (childhood)
Devils and Realist, Ashutarosu
Line Offline Salaryman, Jessica
Line Town, Jessica, Aunt
2014
Yu-Gi-Oh! Zexal II, Tron, Ōhi
2015
Attack on Titan: Junior High, Ilse Langnar
The Seven Deadly Sins, Arthur Pendragon
Dog Days", Verde
Gintama°, Isao Kondo (childhood)
Triage X, Goryū
Mr. Osomatsu, Chibita
Mobile Suit Gundam: Iron-Blooded Orphans, Azee Gurumin
2016
Snow White with the Red Hair 2nd Season, Kazuki
Kamiwaza Wanda, Yuto Kamiya
Mob Psycho 100, Shou Suzuki
My Hero Academia, Katsuki Bakugo (childhood)
2017
Pocket Monsters: Sun & Moon, Professor Burnet
Tomica Hyper Rescue Drive Head Kidō Kyūkyū Keisatsu as Taiga Yagura
Tsugumomo as Shirou Shiramine
2018
Laid-Back Camp as Ryōko Toba
The Seven Deadly Sins: Revival of The Commandments, Arthur Pendragon
Doreiku as Zero Shinagawa
2019
Beyblade Burst GT as Pot Hope
2020
Tsugu Tsugumomo as Shirou Shiramine
Iwa-Kakeru! -Sport Climbing Girls- as Chigusa Kumagai
2021
Mars Red as Shinnosuke Tenmaya
2022
Legend of Mana: The Teardrop Crystal as Duelle
2023
The Fire Hunter as Kun

Theatrical animation
Eiga Drive Head: Tomica Hyper Rescue Kidō Kyūkyū Keisatsu (2018), Taiga Yagura
Mr. Osomatsu: The Movie (2019), Chibita
Mr. Osomatsu: Hipipo-Zoku to Kagayaku Kajitsu (2022), Chibita

OVA/OAD
Attack on Titan: Ilse's Notebook (2013), Ilse Langnar

ONA
Xam'd: Lost Memories (2008), Seitaka

Video games
Fuga: Melodies of Steel 2, Kyle Bavarois, Cannelle Muscat
Granblue Fantasy, Caim
Goes!, Masanori Niiyama
Katekyō Hitman Reborn!, Fran
Yu-Gi-Oh! Zexal: Clash! Duel Carnival!, Tron
The Seven Deadly Sins: Grand Cross, Arthur Pendragon 
Zakusesuhebun, Raguel Noir

Drama CD
Goes! Drama CD Series, Masanori Niiyama
Katekyō Hitman Reborn!, Fran

Tokusatsu
Ultraman Nexus (ep 26)
Ultraseven X (ep 4)

Live-action films
Shi ga Futari wo Wakatsu Made: Nananka, Sayoko Noriki

Dubbing roles

Live-action
The 100, Octavia Blake (Marie Avgeropoulos)
All My Life, Jenn Carter (Jessica Rothe)
Clarice, Ardelia Mapp (Devyn A. Tyler)
Squid Game, Kang Sae-byeok (HoYeon Jung)

Animation
OK K.O.! Let's Be Heroes, Enid

References

External links
  
 

1984 births
Living people
Japanese video game actresses
Japanese voice actresses
Voice actresses from Saitama Prefecture